Katherine Bloom is an American folk songwriter based in Litchfield, Connecticut.

Biography
The daughter of oboist Robert Bloom, Bloom grew up in New Haven, Connecticut, where she studied the cello as a child and started playing the guitar when she was a teenager.

Bloom collaborated with Bruce Neumann in the early 1970s, and started to record music with avant-garde guitarist Loren MazzaCane Connors in 1976. Bloom and Connors recorded multiple albums of fragile, simple folk and blues melodies, the majority of which were written by Bloom. She cites Robert Johnson and Lightnin' Hopkins as inspiration in this period. Their collaboration ended in 1984 with the release of their final album Moonlight, of which only 300 copies were pressed.

Bloom stopped recording new material soon after her collaboration with Connors ended, and a period of financial hardship followed. A single mother, Bloom focused on raising her children, rarely playing shows outside of New Haven. She began writing songs and recording again in the early 1990s. According to a 2016 interview, Bloom first started touring in 2009, and she enjoys performing now more than she did earlier in her career.

Film director Richard Linklater was introduced to Bloom's music through his friend and fellow director Caveh Zahedi sometime in the early 1990s and featured her song "Come Here" in his 1995 film Before Sunrise. Encouraged by Linklater's interest in her music, Bloom started writing new songs and released her first album in over 10 years, titled Come Here: The Florida Years, in 1999.

A tribute album titled Loving Takes This Course was released in 2009 and features artists such as Devendra Banhart, Bill Callahan, Mark Kozelek, The Dodos, and Scout Niblett.

Presently Bloom trains donkeys and plays with her band Love at Work, which includes longtime collaborator Tom Hanford and husband Stan Bronski, offering a musical programs for children and adults as well as playing solo shows in the Northeastern U.S. Bloom has been working with children since 1989. She lives in Litchfield, Connecticut.

Discography
 With Loren Mazzacane
 Gifts LP, Daggett Records, 1978
 Fields LP, Daggett Records, 1978
 Hanford, Bloom And Mazzacane LP (with Tom Hanford), Daggett Records, 1981
 Listen to the Blues 7-inch EP (with Tom Hanford), Daggett Records, 1981
 Pushin' Up Daisies 7-inch EP, Daggett Records, 1982
 'Round His Shoulders Gonna Be A Rainbow LP, Daggett Records, 1982
 Sing the Children Over LP, Ambiguous Records, 1982
 Guitar Pieces cassette, Daggett Records, 1983
 Sand in My Shoe LP, St. Joan Records, 1983
 Restless Faithful Desperate LP, St. Joan Records, 1984
 Moonlight LP, St. Joan Records, 1984

 Solo
 Come Here: The Florida Years CD, self-released, 1999
 Terror CD, Chapter Music, 2008
 Thin Thin Line CD, Caldo Verde, 2010
 It's Just a Dream CD, self-released reissue, 1996, 2011 
 Here I Am CD, Caldo Verde, 2012
 Somewhere in California CD, Vow Records, 2014
 Pass Through Here CD, Chapter Music, 2015
 This Dream of Life CD, Caldo Verde, 2017
 Bye Bye These Are The Days LP Dear Life Records, 2020

 Compilations
 1981-1984 CD, Megalon Records, 2000
 Finally CD, Chapter Music, 2006
 Sing the Children Over / Sand in My Shoe 2-CD, Chapter Music, 2008
 Restless Faithful Desperate / Moonlight 2-CD, Chapter Music, 2009

 Tribute albums
 Loving Takes This Course 2-CD, Chapter Music, 2009

References

American women singer-songwriters
Living people
Year of birth missing (living people)
People from Litchfield, Connecticut
American folk musicians
Singer-songwriters from New York (state)
Musicians from New Haven, Connecticut
21st-century American women
Singer-songwriters from Connecticut